Alloclita insignitella is a moth in the family Cosmopterigidae. 
It was described by Harald Udo von Riedl in 1993. It is mainly found in Saudi Arabia.

References

Natural History Museum Lepidoptera generic names catalog

Antequerinae
Moths described in 1993
Moths of Asia